

Christian Philipp (3 September 1893 – 16 October 1963) was a German general during World War II who commanded several divisions. He was  a recipient of the Knight's Cross of the Iron Cross of Nazi Germany.

Awards and decorations

 Knight's Cross of the Iron Cross on 11 March 1945 as Generalleutnant and commander of 8. Jäger-Division

References

Citations

Bibliography

 

1893 births
1963 deaths
Lieutenant generals of the German Army (Wehrmacht)
German Army personnel of World War I
Recipients of the clasp to the Iron Cross, 1st class
Recipients of the Gold German Cross
Recipients of the Knight's Cross of the Iron Cross
German prisoners of war in World War II
People from Schwäbisch Hall (district)
People from the Kingdom of Württemberg
20th-century Freikorps personnel
Military personnel from Baden-Württemberg
German Army generals of World War II